Harold Buck was an English professional rugby league footballer who played in the 1910s and 1920s. In November 1921, Buck became rugby league's first £1,000 player when he transferred from Hunslet to Leeds, (based on increases in average earnings, this would be approximately £152,100 in 2018). Buck made his début for Leeds against Wigan at Headingley Rugby Stadium, Leeds on Saturday 5 November 1921, he went on to play 99-matches for Leeds scoring 72-tries and 15-goals, for 246-points. Buck played , i.e. number 2, and scored a try in Leeds' 28-3 victory over Hull F.C. in the 1922–23 Challenge Cup Final during the 1922-23 season at Belle Vue, Wakefield, the only occasion the Challenge Cup final has ever been staged at Belle Vue. In 1924 Harold Buck made a replacement appearance in the Great Britain trial match in advance of the 1924 Great Britain Lions tour, but Buck was ultimately not selected for the tour. Harold Buck was the landlord, and he and his wife, Florrie (née Fox), ran The Coburg Tavern at the junction of Woodhouse Lane and Claypit Lane, in Leeds. The Leeds backline in the early 1920s was known as the Busy Bs, as it included; Jim Bacon, Arthur Binks, Billy Bowen, Joe Brittain, and Harold Buck.

References

External links
Search for "Buck" at rugbyleagueproject.org

English rugby league players
Hunslet F.C. (1883) players
Leeds Rhinos players
Rugby articles needing expert attention
Rugby league wingers
Rugby league players from Leeds
Year of death missing
Year of birth missing